Giant's Tank Sanctuary ( Kaṭṭukkarai Kuḷam Caraṇālayam) is a wildlife sanctuary in northern Sri Lanka, approximately  south east of Mannar.

History
Giant's Tank and its surrounding area was designated as a sanctuary on 24 September 1954 under the Fauna and Flora Protection Ordinance (No. 2) of 1937.

Giant's Tank Sanctuary has been subject to illegal deforestation to make way for banana plantation for the Dole Food Company.

Flora and fauna
Giant's Tank is surrounded by rice paddies and dry scrub forest. Numerous varieties of water and wader birds are found in the sanctuary including the Eurasian wigeon, garganey, knob-billed duck and pygmy goose. Fish found in the tank include channa striata, heteropneustes fossilis, labeo dussumieri, Mozambique tilapia, olive barb, ompok bimaculatus and long-snouted barb. Asian elephants are also found in the sanctuary.

References

1954 establishments in Ceylon
Important Bird Areas of Sri Lanka
Madhu DS Division
Protected areas established in 1954
Protected areas in Northern Province, Sri Lanka
Wildlife sanctuaries of Sri Lanka